The Viking 28 is a Canadian sailboat, that was designed by Cuthbertson & Cassian and first built in 1968.

Production
The boat was built by Ontario Yachts in Burlington, Ontario, Canada between 1968 and 1983, with 147 examples completed. Initial production was in the form of a kit for amateur construction, but later many were professionally built.

The Viking 28 design was also built in England by Anesty Yachts as the Trapper 28/400, with 70 completed.

Design

The Viking 28 was the first boat designed by Cuthbertson & Cassian to be produced by Ontario Yachts.

The Viking 28 is a small recreational keelboat, built predominantly of fiberglass, with wood trim. It has a masthead sloop rig, an internally-mounted spade-type rudder and a fixed fin keel. It displaces  and carries  of ballast.

Many modifications were incorporated in 1974, including a wider companionway, with a pop-up hatch, plus a modified mast step and V-berth to make the hull stronger.

The boat has a PHRF racing average handicap of 186 with a high of 189 and low of 183.

Operational history
In a review Michael McGoldrick wrote, "The Viking 28 is a fast, relatively light weight boat that was designed by C&C and built by Ontario Yachts. Its cabin does not have standing headroom, which is something of an oddity for a modern production 28 footer. On the other hand, this meant there was no need to incorporate a high freeboard, or otherwise compromise the lines of this design, in order to accommodate for standing headroom in this boat. As a well known British designer (Uffa Fox) once said, "If you want to stand up, go on deck"."

See also
List of sailing boat types

Similar sailboats
Alerion Express 28
Aloha 28
Beneteau First 285
Beneteau Oceanis 281
Bristol Channel Cutter
Cal 28
Catalina 28
Cumulus 28
Grampian 28
Hunter 28
Hunter 28.5
Hunter 280
J/28
O'Day 28
Pearson 28
Sabre 28
Sea Sprite 27
Sirius 28
Tanzer 8.5
Tanzer 28
TES 28 Magnam

References

External links

Keelboats
1960s sailboat type designs
Sailing yachts
Sailboat types built by Ontario Yachts
Sailboat types built by Anesty Yachts
Sailboat type designs by C&C Design